Emperor Giản Định (1375–1410), real name Trần Ngỗi (陳頠), was the leader of the Vietnamese Trần royalist forces who rebelled against the Ming Chinese rules.

Giản Định was the second son of Trần Nghệ Tông, was given the title Giản Định vương (簡定王, "Prince Giản Định"). Ming China conquered Vietnam in 1407, he fled to Mô Độ (modern Yên Mô District, Ninh Bình Province) and revolted against China in September 1408. At first he was defeated by Chinese army, later, he was supported by two Vietnamese generals, Đặng Tất and Nguyễn Cảnh Chân, and occupied Nghệ An Province successfully. Giản Định decided to attack Đông Đô (modern Hanoi) but was opposed by Đặng Tất and Nguyễn Cảnh Chân. Giản Định soon had both Đặng Tất and Nguyễn Cảnh Chân arrested and killed, causing dissent and revolt in his army. Đặng Dung and Nguyễn Cảnh Dị, sons of Đặng Tất and Nguyễn Cảnh Chân respectively, installed Trần Quý Khoáng (Trùng Quang Đế) as the new emperor in Chi La (modern Đức Thọ District, Hà Tĩnh Province).

Giản Định was arrested by Trùng Quang in 1409, and was granted the title thái thượng hoàng ("Retired Emperor"). He was sent to Hạ Hồng (modern Ninh Giang District, Hải Dương Province) to attack Chinese army, but was defeated by Zhang Fu and fled to Diễn Châu. Consequently, the Chinese took him captive and transferred him to Nanjing, where he was beheaded around 1410.

References

|- style="text-align: center;"

|-

|-

|-
|-

|-

Trần dynasty emperors
Trần dynasty retired emperors
1410 deaths
Year of birth unknown
15th-century Vietnamese monarchs
Founding monarchs